Brinkhaven is nestled on the edge of Knox County, Ohio, on the east side of the Mohican River. Originally surveyed in 1838, the village has been known as Nonperil, Mount Holly, Gann, and finally Brinkhaven. In the early 1900’s it was a village on the rise from the railroad business, now it is a quiet and quaint home to its 121 residents.

Geography
Brinkhaven is located at  (40.468265, -82.192065), along the Mohican River.

The Bridge of Dreams is located on the Mohican River in Brinkhaven.

Demographics

2010 census
As of the census of 2010, there were 125 people, 54 households, and 40 families living in the village. The racial makeup of the village was 100.0% White. Hispanic or Latino of any race were 2.4% of the population.

There were 54 households, of which 33.3% had children under the age of 18 living with them, 42.6% were married couples living together, 18.5% had a female householder with no husband present, 13.0% had a male householder with no wife present, and 25.9% were non-families. 22.2% of all households were made up of individuals, and 9.3% had someone living alone who was 65 years of age or older. The average household size was 2.31 and the average family size was 2.58.

The median age in the village was 42.2 years. 24.8% of residents were under the age of 18; 4% were between the ages of 18 and 24; 28% were from 25 to 44; 30.4% were from 45 to 64; and 12.8% were 65 years of age or older. The gender makeup of the village was 51.2% male and 48.8% female.

2000 census
As of the census of 2000, there were 143 people, 51 households, and 36 families living in the village. The population density was 749.6 people per square mile (290.6/km2). There were 55 housing units at an average density of 288.3 per square mile (111.8/km2). The racial makeup of the village was 100.00% White. Hispanic or Latino of any race were 0.70% of the population.

There were 51 households, out of which 41.2% had children under the age of 18 living with them, 58.8% were married couples living together, 9.8% had a female householder with no husband present, and 29.4% were non-families. 27.5% of all households were made up of individuals, and 11.8% had someone living alone who was 65 years of age or older. The average household size was 2.80 and the average family size was 3.42.

In the village, the population was spread out, with 30.8% under the age of 18, 11.9% from 18 to 24, 28.7% from 25 to 44, 16.1% from 45 to 64, and 12.6% who were 65 years of age or older. The median age was 30 years. For every 100 females there were 93.2 males. For every 100 females age 18 and over, there were 110.6 males.

The median income for a household in the village was $37,500, and the median income for a family was $37,857. Males had a median income of $30,938 versus $11,750 for females. The per capita income for the village was $10,717. There were 5.6% of families and 17.7% of the population living below the poverty line, including 25.6% of under eighteens and none of those over 64.

See also

 List of villages in Ohio

References

External links

Villages in Knox County, Ohio
Villages in Ohio